José Ignacio Sánchez Galán1 (born 1950) better known as Ignacio Galán,  is a Spanish businessman who currently serves as chairman of Iberdrola, a multinational energy company  with a presence in dozens of countries worldwide with  subsidiaries including ScottishPower in the United Kingdom, Avangrid in USA, Neoenergia in Brazil, Infigen in Australia and Iberdrola Mexico.

Early life
Galán was born in 1950 in Salamanca, Spain. As a young man, he moved to Madrid to study industrial engineering at the ICAI School of Engineering attached to Comillas Pontifical University.

Galán also graduated in business administration from the ICADE Business School and in Business Administration and Foreign Trade from the EOI Business School. He speaks English, French, Italian and Portuguese and is married with four children.

Career

Early career
Galán's career got under way in 1972 at Sociedad Española del Acumulador Tudor, where he held various executive posts and oversaw the company's international expansion.

In the early 1990s, Galán took the helm at Industria de Turbopropulsores (ITP)2 from its inception. Between 1993 and 1995 he was chairman of Eurojet, a European consortium that developed and manufactured the Eurojet 200 powerplants fitted to the Eurofighter. He then went on to serve as chief executive at Airtel Móvil.

Career at Iberdrola
In 2001, Galán was appointed the executive vice-chairman and chief executive of Iberdrola and in 2006 he earned the position of executive chairman at the company.3 As Iberdrola's chairman and chief executive officer, he obtained total remuneration of 6.17 million euros in 2015, plus shares valued at 3.2 million euros. At Iberdrola's 2016 General Meeting of Shareholders (held on 8 April), the advisory vote on the Annual Report on the Remuneration of Board Members revealed support of 97.84% from shareholders present at the meeting, thus making Galán Spain's fifth best paid executive in 2015.15

In addition to his role at Iberdrola, Galán is a visiting lecturer at the University of Strathclyde in Glasgow and has also given lectures at the Industrial Engineering College attached to Comillas Pontifical University in Madrid. In 2012, he was appointed chairman of the Social Council of the University of Salamanca.4

In an article published in April 2021, The New York Times highlighted Iberdrola as a "leader" in renewables thanks to "the commitment" that Ignacio Galán made to renewables 20 years ago and underlined how since Galán took the reins of the energy company he has had "the mission to change the electricity industry" and that "it was very clear to him that he saw the United States as having enormous potential in renewables".

In October 2020, the Financial Times described Ignacio Galán as "the engineer" who has transformed what was a second-tier Spanish company into the world's third-largest utility since he took the helm in 2001, transforming it from a primarily domestic company with coal, hydroelectric and oil-fired plants into a leader in clean energy, as well as an owner of electricity grids. Its acquisitions in countries such as Brazil, Mexico, the UK and the US have made the group the third largest utility in the world by market value.

Other activities

Corporate boards
 JPMorgan Chase, Member of the International Council (since 2018)

Non-profit organizations
 World Economic Forum (WEF), Chair of the Electricity Cluster 
 Elcano Royal Institute for International and Strategic Studies, Member of the Board of Trustees
 European Round Table of Industrialists (ERT), Member of the Board and Steering Committee
 Renewable Hydrogen Coalition (RHC), Chair

Recognition
Galán has been bestowed numerous awards and accolades over the course of his career. In 2011, he received an honorary degree from the University of Edinburgh and from the University of Salamanca, 5 on account of his “proven ability to bring about change and innovate and his future vision”6, while in 2013 he was handed an honorary degree in science from the University of Strathclyde in Glasgow. He is also a member of GlobalScot, an international Scottish government network of the business leaders who are most keenly committed to the economic development of Scotland. 

Throughout his career he has received numerous recognitions, including the following: One of the 100 CEOs included in the Brand Finance Brand Guardianship Index 2021; selected between the best five CEO of the world on the Harvard Business Review Ranking; recognized as one of the 10's more influential CEO in the fight against climate change, according to Bloomberg; best Chief Executive Officer (CEO) within the utilities category (for the eleventh time) according to the Institutional Investor Research Group 201; and best CEO of European utilities and Spanish listed companies in investors relations, according to the Thomson Extel Survey 2011.

For three years running, he was named “Best CEO in Investor Relations” by IR Magazine (2003–2005). The award is based on opinions gathered from stock market analysts and investment fund managers. He was also named “Best CEO of the Year” in 2006 at the Platts Global Energy Awards.7

In 2008, he was crowned “Business Leader of the Year” by the Spain-U.S. Chamber of Commerce8 and that same year he also received the “International Economy Award” from the Cristóbal Gabarrón Foundation.9 José Ignacio Galán has also been named Council of Bilbao by the Bilbao Chamber of Commerce and obtained the 2009 Gold Medal from the Province of Salamanca.10

In 2011, he was handed the Lagun Onari award by the Basque Government, which is given to prominent non-Basque individuals in recognition of their efforts to promote Basque history and culture and improve the region's economy.11

In 2014, he received the FIRST Award for Responsible Capitalism and that very same year, Elizabeth II of the United Kingdom bestowed on him the honorary title of Commander of the Order of the British Empire.12

In 2016, Galán received his tenth Best Chief Executive Officer award in European electric utilities, which is issued by the Institutional Investor Research Group.13 14

References

External links
1 CORPORATE, IBERDROLA. “Presidente - Iberdrola”. www.iberdrola.com. Viewed on 2016-11-05.

2 ATTEST. “ITP. Manufacturer of turbines and aeronautical engines”. www.itp.es. Viewed on 2016-11-05.

3  “Iberdrola apuesta por las renovables”. El Periódico Extremadura. Viewed on 2016-11-05.

4  Presidente del Consejo Social de la USAL, EuropaPress, 31/05/2012.

5  Doctor Honoris Causa por la USAL, Universidad de Salamanca, 2/12/2011.

6  Ignacio Galán, doctor honoris causa por su visión de futuro y asunción de riesgos, El Mundo, 2/12/2011.

7  Ignacio Galán e Iberdrola reciben en Nueva York los galardones al Máximo Ejecutivo del Año y a la Compañía Energética del Año de Platts, El Economista, 1/12/2006.

8  Ignacio Galán, Líder Empresarial del Año, El Mundo, 12/06/2008.

9  Premio Internacional Fundación Cristóbal Gabarrón de Economía, Energía Diario, 10/10/2008.

10  El presidente de Iberdrola recibe en Salamanca la medalla de oro de la provincia, RTVCYL, 21/09/2009.

11  El Gobierno vasco concede la distinción Lagun Onari a Ignacio Galán, B.O.P.V., 18/10/2011.

12  “Galán, condecorado como Comendador Honorario de la Orden del Imperio Británico”, europapress.es. 2014-05-22. Viewed on 2016-11-07.

13  Mejor Primer Ejecutivo de las eléctricas europeas 2015, Institutional Investor, 2015.

14  Ignacio Galán mejor CEO de las utilities europeas, Lainformacion.com, 3/11/2016.

15  EL PAÍS newspaper, 30 March 2012.

1950 births
Living people
People from Salamanca
Spanish businesspeople
Comillas Pontifical University alumni
Directors of Iberdrola